The 1981 Humberside County Council election was held on Thursday, 7 May. Following boundary changes to the county's electoral divisions, the whole council of 75 members was up for election. The Labour Party regained control of the council from the Conservative Party, winning 42 seats.

Humberside was a created as a non-metropolitan county in England by the Local Government Act 1972, with the first elections to the county council taking place in 1973. It was abolished on 1 April 1996 and replaced by East Riding of Yorkshire, Kingston upon Hull, North East Lincolnshire and North Lincolnshire.

Results by division
Each electoral division returned one county councillor. The candidate elected to the council in each electoral division is shown in the table below. "Unopposed" indicates that the councillor was elected unopposed.

References

1981
1981 English local elections
1980s in Yorkshire
1980s in Lincolnshire